Respekt is a Czech weekly newsmagazine published in Prague, the Czech Republic, reporting on domestic and foreign political and economic issues, as well as on science and culture.

History and profile

[[Image:respekt cover 1990-01.gif|thumb|upright|Respekt'''s first cover (March 14, 1990)]]Respekt was founded very soon after the fall of Communist party from power in 1989 by a group of samizdat journalists as one of the first independent magazines. It is the successor of Informační servis (Information service), an opposition samizdat paper. Respekt is published weekly and has its headquarters in Prague.  The New York Times describes Respekt as "influential."

Editors describe Respekt as "a liberal magazine which stands up for freedom of thought and the need of continuous questioning of its outcomes". The weekly concentrates on investigative journalism (often using information gleaned from police sources) and in-depth articles, and has been expanding to cover ecological activism and alternative culture movements in recent years.

In 2005 Respekt published details about business connection between Prime Minister Stanislav Gross' wife and a brothel owner, starting a scandal leading to downfall of Gross several months later; in 2008 it published an article alleging that Milan Kundera, when a student, denounced to the police a Czech spy for the West.Milan Kundera demands apology from Respekt for defaming him

The circulation of the weekly peaked at over 100,000 copies in the middle of the 1990s. At this time the (loss generating) weekly was bought by Karel Schwarzenberg´s R-Presse. The circulation has been dropping steadily over the time causing Respekt's losses to increase to 7 million Czk in 2003. In 2006 Zdeněk Bakala obtained majority in Respekt and planned to eliminate the loss by making the journal more mainstream. The proposed changes led to fear among both readers and the editors that the unique flavour of the weekly will be destroyed; in September 2006 all editors threatened to leave. Within a week the owners submitted to the pressure, recalled the manager responsible to implement the changes and brought in a new editor-in-chief, Martin M. Šimečka, former editor-in-chief of the Slovak daily SME. Modification of the visual style and the format was delayed until September 2007.

The circulation in 2006 was around 25,000 copies and the weekly was read by approximately 80,000 people each week. In 2007 the circulation was around 16-17,000 copies. According to a February 2008 survey, it is read by 94,000 people and remains one of the most cited journals and newspapers in the Czech Republic.

Legal actions
Since Respekt regularly reports on its investigations into bribery scandals, criminal activity or government mishandling, legal action is periodically taken against Respekt, often by top level politicians. Most of these cases that have gone to court have been won by the weekly.

The most visible case was the Czech government's 2001 attempt to sue Respekt for libel. Miloš Zeman, the instigator of the case, saw it as a way to "put the journal to its end". The case fizzled away only embarrassing the government.

Editors in chief

 Jan Ruml (1990)
 Ivan Lamper (1990–1994)
 Vladimír Mlynář (1994–1997)
 Martin Fendrych (1998)
 Petr Holub (1998–2002)
 Tomáš Němeček (2003–2005)
 Marek Švehla (2005–2006)
 Martin Milan Šimečka (2006–2009)
 Erik Tabery (2009–present)

Visual styleRespekt used its own distinguished visual style that stayed almost unchanged since 1990. With A3 format (24 or 32 pages) and black & white print it resembled more a daily newspaper than a magazine (most of the magazines in the Czech Republic are smaller and printed on glossy paper with heavy use of color and photos).

Front cover drawings by illustrator Pavel Reisenauer very soon became a symbol of the weekly. After several years the front page drawings switched from black and white to color. Reisenauer also contributed with drawings on the back cover and for the articles. All photos were black and white, their number was intentionally kept down. Advertisements were added at the end of 1991 in limited form, compared to other Czech journals.

The changes planned by the new owner in 2006 (glossy paper, use of color, coverage of day-to-day events or consumer advice) were cancelled at the time (see history above). In September 2007 the format has been changed, color replaced the black & white photos and the advertisement section was expanded.

Web presence
During the early 2000s all old issues of Respekt'' have been converted into electronic form and made available online for subscribers in PDF form. An attempt to establish a commercial news-bulletin sent by email failed. In 2006 Respekt was among the first Czech newspapers to provide blogging space for the public on their website.

References

External links
 respekt.cz / respekt.eu – Respekt online: official website
 Respekt in English, some articles in English
 History of Respekt: overview 1, overview 2 (in Czech)

1989 establishments in Czechoslovakia
Czech-language magazines
Magazines established in 1989
Magazines published in Prague
News magazines published in Europe
Weekly magazines